Gérson Pereira da Silva, (September 23, 1965 – May 17, 1994), sometimes known as just Gérson, was a Brazilian footballer who played as a forward.

Biography
Gerson da Silva’s talents became evident at age 18, when he was top scorer in the Copa São Paulo de Futebol Júnior 1984 with Santos. Having spent the Guarani de Campinas and Paulista Futebol Clube, became the idol of Atlético Mineiro and Sport Club Internacional, clubs whereby, within 4 years, was three times top scorer of the Copa do Brasil (1989 and 1991 by Atletico, 1992 by Inter), and remains the only player to have hit that mark. In 1991, he helped Atletico to the biggest win of all time in the Brazil Cup: 11–0 in Caiçara Esporte Clube, Campo Maior, Piauí, at Independence Stadium in Belo Horizonte, having scored five goals in this game. At International, where he was known affectionately as "Nego Gerson," he scored a number of  beautiful goals and was instrumental in the successful campaigns of the Copa do Brasil of 1992 (when he scored 9 of the team's 18 goals) and Campeonato Gaúcho, won just 10 days after. At the time that the Colorado lifted the Brazilian Cup, the coach Antônio Lopes became aware of the clinical state of Gérson. However, rather than remove him from the group, Lopes kept between holders. The coach confirmed that used the example of basketball player Magic Johnson, gold medal at the 1992 Summer Olympics months before, to motivate his shirt 9. He died in 1994, victim of toxoplasmosis, a few months after leaving to train for health problems related to AIDS. His wife Andréa Felipe Silva confirmed that Gerson died from AIDS and accused International of abandoning him. According to statements from the direction of the International, Gérson was diagnosed with HIV, however the player and his family have always denied. Recently doctors declared that centre forward probably never would have received proper treatment at the time due to the lack of progress in the area, and was apparently upset with the psychological state, possibly due to personal problems or his health, since he never proved to be believer its recovery. For these reasons, the disease could have advanced more quickly.

Career 
Santos: 1985.
Guarani: 1985.
Paulista: 1986–1987.
Atlético Mineiro: 1988–1991.
Internacional: 1992–1993.

Team awards 
Rio Grande do Sul State Championship – 1992 – Internacional
Minas Gerais State Championship – 1988 and 1989 – Atlético Mineiro
Copa do Brasil: 1992 – Internacional
Brazil squad 1985 FIFA World Youth Championship – 1985.

Single 
Gunner's 1985 FIFA World Youth Championship – 1985
Gunner's Special Division Championship 1988 by Paulista Jundiai
Top scorer of the 1989 Copa do Brasil, 1991 Copa do Brasil and 1992 Copa do Brasil

References

External links
 internacional.com.br
 globoesporte.globo.com
 impedimento.org
 ogol.com.br
 
 
 

1965 births
1994 deaths
AIDS-related deaths in São Paulo (state)
Sportspeople from Santos, São Paulo
Brazilian footballers
Association football forwards
Santos FC players
Sport Club Internacional players
Brazil international footballers